Sheafe is a surname. Notable people by that name include:

 James Sheafe (1755–1829), United States Representative and Senator from New Hampshire.
 Alexander Sheafe, governor of the Bank of England from 1752 to 1754.
 Thomas Sheafe (died 1639), canon of Windsor from 1614 to 1639.

See also
 Sheafe Baronets